Moore Dam is a major hydroelectric dam on the Upper Connecticut River between Grafton County, New Hampshire and Caledonia County, Vermont in the northeastern United States. The dam is located near Littleton, New Hampshire, and forms the  Moore Reservoir. The Moore Station is the largest conventional hydroelectric plant in New England, in terms of installed capacity and average power generation. The dam and reservoir also provide flood control, recreational boating and fishing.

The official name of the dam is the Samuel C. Moore Dam, after a former president of the now defunct New England Power Company that originally built it. The dam, reservoir and power station are now owned and operated by TransCanada Corporation.

History
The Moore Dam is the uppermost feature of the Fifteen Miles Falls hydroelectric project, which began development in the early 1900s by New England Power (later USGen New England). The steep grade and heavy flow also made it ideal for the construction of water mills, and later, hydroelectric plants. In 1908 Carl A. Ross of Littleton pitched the proposal to Massachusetts investors who agreed to finance the project.

Site preparations for Moore Reservoir commenced in the mid-1930s, with the clearing of over 3,000 acres of farmland and forest to allow for future flooding. The towns of Upper Waterford, Vermont and Pattenville, New Hampshire were demolished; however, with the onset of the Great Depression preliminary work on Moore Dam was halted. Construction was not resumed until 1954, and was completed in 1956, at a cost of $41 million. The dam was dedicated, and power generation begun, on June 20, 1957.

The embankment section of the dam has experienced seepage problems at several points in its lifetime, the first during the 1980s, which was corrected in 1996 with the construction of a drainage system. The leak re-emerged in 2009 and 2010, when it was discovered that water was leaking between the dam structure and the original ground surface, requiring extensive re-construction and filling work.

In 2005 USGen New England filed for bankruptcy, and TransCanada purchased Moore Dam and 13 other hydroelectric stations for the sum of $505 million. As of 2016, TransCanada intends to sell the dam to local utilities in Vermont and New Hampshire.

Operations
While most dams along the Connecticut River have small reservoirs, capable only of regulating daily fluctuations in water level, Moore Dam has a large storage capacity used both to regulate river flows on a seasonal basis, and to generate peaking power on demand. Along with Comerford Dam, it helps reduce spring floods due to snowmelt, at the same time capturing water for use during drier parts of the year. During the late fall or winter, the reservoir is drawn down to provide space for the incoming snowmelt. The snowpack is measured throughout the winter and reservoir levels are adjusted up or down based on these measurements.

Due to its size and security requirements, Moore Dam is one of only two dams in New Hampshire that has a human operator living on-site (the other being the Murphy Dam).

Statistics
The spillway is located on the concrete section and is controlled by four gates: a  sluice gates, and three  tainter gates.

The power station is located at the base of the dam and consists of four 56,400 horsepower turbines each powering a generator rated at 35,100 kilowatts (kW). In 2009, the Moore Station generated 314,300 megawatt hours (MWh). The average generation of the whole Fifteen Mile Falls project (Moore, Comerford and McIndoe dams combined) was 662,947 MWh for the period 1999–2009.

Environmental impacts

For decades before the dams were built, paper mills and factories along the Connecticut River had been dumping their waste in the river; each spring, floods would flush the contaminants towards the ocean. When Moore Dam was constructed the mill waste was trapped in the reservoir where it settled into the lake bottom sediment creating highly anoxic conditions. However, fish populations must still be replenished each year by artificial stocking.

Because the downstream McIndoe Dam posed a total barrier to both upstream fish migration in the Connecticut River, neither the Moore or Comerford dams was built with fish passage facilities. The great height of the dam precludes the installation of structures such as fish ladders and has posed an obstacle to restoring salmon runs in the Connecticut River, as the best spawning areas for salmon are located in the headwaters area upstream of the dam.

Recreation
Moore Reservoir is one of the largest "undeveloped" lakes in New England, with few private homes or businesses along its shores. The reservoir area is owned by TransCanada, which permits public access. There are four boat ramps on the New Hampshire side of the reservoir and one directly below Moore Dam. The dam has portage facilities on both the Vermont and New Hampshire sides for use by canoeists and kayakers. Fish species found in the lake include salmon, trout, pike, pickerel, perch, bass and sunfish. Because of the reservoir's great size and catchment area, it is subject to waves and particularly large amounts of floating tree trunks and debris.

See also
List of dams and reservoirs in New Hampshire
List of dams and reservoirs in Vermont

References

External links
Current water release schedule at TransCanada dams

Dams in Vermont
Dams in New Hampshire
Dams completed in 1956
Earth-filled dams
TC Energy dams